is the first full-length album by J-pop group Berryz Kobo. It was released on July 7, 2004. It was associated with the Hello!Project. The group Berryz Kobo had several other albums after this and also collaborated with the anime series Inazuma Eleven for their closing theme song.

Track listing 
 
 
 
 
 
 
 
 
 "Today is My Birthday"

Charts

References

External links 
 1st Chō Berryz entry on the Up-Front Works official website

Berryz Kobo albums
Piccolo Town-King Records albums
2004 debut albums
Albums produced by Tsunku
Japanese-language albums